Hylotelephium cyaneum (syn. Sedum cyaneum), commonly known as the azure stonecrop, is a perennial mat-forming succulent groundcover plant of the family Crassulaceae. Its native range is in eastern Siberia and Russian Far East.

Description
It has short dark red stems with fleshy grey leaves with a hint of purple. It flowers in late summer and early autumn. It can be used in gravel or rock gardens and as a patio or container plant.

References

cyaneum
Groundcovers